This list of the mammal species in Afghanistan provides information about the status of the 129 mammal species occurring in Afghanistan. Four are endangered, twelve are vulnerable, and five are near threatened.
The following classes, which lie on a spectrum of lowest to highest risk of extinction, are used to highlight each species' global conservation status as assessed on the IUCN Red List:

Order: Artiodactyla (even-toed ungulates)

The even-toed ungulates are ungulates whose weight is borne about equally by the third and fourth toes, rather than mostly or entirely by the third as in perissodactyls. There are about 220 artiodactyl species, including many that are of great economic importance to humans.
Family: Bovidae (cattle, antelope, sheep, goats)
Subfamily: Antilopinae
Genus: Gazella
Chinkara, G. bennettii 
Goitered gazelle, G. subgutturosa 
Subfamily: Caprinae
Genus: Capra
Wild goat, C. aegagrus  presence uncertain
Markhor, C. falconeri 
Siberian ibex, C. sibrica 
Genus: Ovis
Argali, O. ammon 
Urial, O. vignei 
Genus: Nemorhaedus
Himalayan goral, N. goral 
Family: Moschidae
Genus: Moschus
Kashmir musk deer, M. cupreus 
Family: Cervidae (deer)
Subfamily: Cervinae
Genus: Cervus
Central Asian red deer C. hanglu 
Bactrian deer, C. h. bactrianus
Family: Suidae (pigs)
Subfamily: Suinae
Genus: Sus
Wild boar, S. scrofa

Order: Carnivora (carnivorans)

There are over 260 species of carnivorans, the majority of which eat meat as their primary dietary item. They have a characteristic skull shape and dentition.

The following species are listed as historically present:
Suborder: Feliformia
Family: Felidae (cats)
Subfamily: Felinae
Genus: Caracal
 Caracal, C. caracal 
Genus: Felis
Jungle cat, F. chaus 
African wildcat, F. lybica 
Asiatic wildcat, F. l. ornata
Genus: Lynx
 Eurasian lynx, L. lynx 
Genus: Otocolobus
 Pallas's cat, O. manul 
Genus: Prionailurus
 Leopard cat, P. bengalensis 
Subfamily: Pantherinae
Genus: Panthera
 Leopard, P. pardus 
 P. p. tulliana 
 Snow leopard, P. uncia 
Family: Herpestidae (mongooses)
Genus: Urva
Small Indian mongoose, U. auropunctata 
 Indian grey mongoose, U. edwardsii 
Family: Hyaenidae (hyaenas)
Genus: Hyaena
 Striped hyena, H. hyaena 
Suborder: Caniformia
Family: Canidae (dogs, foxes)
Genus: Vulpes
 Blanford's fox, V. cana 
 Corsac fox, V. corsac 
 Rueppell's fox, V. rueppelli 
 Red fox, V. vulpes 
Genus: Canis
 Golden jackal, C. aureus 
 Gray wolf, C. lupus 
Family: Ursidae (bears)
Genus: Ursus
 Brown bear, U. arctos 
 Asiatic black bear, U. thibetanus 
Family: Mustelidae (mustelids)
Genus: Lutra
 European otter, L. lutra 
Genus: Martes
 Yellow-throated marten, M. flavigula 
 Beech marten, M. foina 
Genus: Meles
 Caucasian badger, M. canescens  presence uncertain
Genus: Mellivora
 Honey badger, M. capensis 
Genus: Mustela
 Stoat, M. erminea 
 Least weasel, M. nivalis 
Genus: Vormela
 Marbled polecat, V. peregusna

Order: Chiroptera (bats)

The bats' most distinguishing feature is that their forelimbs are developed as wings, making them the only mammals capable of flight. Bat species account for about 20% of all mammals.
Family: Vespertilionidae
Subfamily: Myotinae
Genus: Myotis
Lesser mouse-eared bat, M. blythii 
Geoffroy's bat, M. emarginatus 
Hodgson's bat, M. formosus 
 Fraternal myotis, M. frater 
Kashmir cave bat, M. longipes 
 Whiskered myotis, M. muricola 
Whiskered bat, M. mystacinus 
Subfamily: Vespertilioninae
Genus: Barbastella
 Eastern barbastelle, B. leucomelas 
Genus: Eptesicus
 Botta's serotine, Eptesicus bottae 
 Gobi big brown bat, Eptesicus gobiensis 
 Serotine bat, Eptesicus serotinus 
Genus: Hypsugo
Savi's pipistrelle, H. savii 
Genus: Nyctalus
Lesser noctule, N. leisleri 
 Mountain noctule, Nyctalus montanus LC
Genus: Otonycteris
 Desert long-eared bat, Otonycteris hemprichii LC
Genus: Pipistrellus
 Indian pipistrelle, Pipistrellus coromandra LC
 Java pipistrelle, Pipistrellus javanicus LC
 Kuhl's pipistrelle, Pipistrellus kuhlii LC
 Common pipistrelle, Pipistrellus pipistrellus LC
 Least pipistrelle, Pipistrellus tenuis LC
Genus: Plecotus
 Grey long-eared bat, Plecotus austriacus LC
Genus: Scotophilus
 Greater Asiatic yellow bat, Scotophilus heathi LC
Genus: Vespertilio
 Parti-coloured bat, Vespertilio murinus LC
Genus: Rhyneptesicus
Sind bat, R. nasutus 
Subfamily: Miniopterinae
Genus: Miniopterus
Common bent-wing bat, M. schreibersii 
Family: Rhinopomatidae
Genus: Rhinopoma
 Lesser mouse-tailed bat, Rhinopoma hardwickei LC
 Small mouse-tailed bat, Rhinopoma muscatellum LC
Family: Molossidae
Genus: Tadarida
European free-tailed bat, T. teniotis 
Family: Megadermatidae
Genus: Megaderma
 Megaderma lyra LC
Family: Rhinolophidae
Subfamily: Rhinolophinae
Genus: Rhinolophus
Blasius's horseshoe bat, R. blasii 
 Bokhara horseshoe bat, Rhinolophus bocharicus LC
Greater horseshoe bat, R. ferrumequinum 
Lesser horseshoe bat, R. hipposideros 
 Blyth's horseshoe bat, Rhinolophus lepidus LC
Mehely's horseshoe bat, R. mehelyi 
Subfamily: Hipposiderinae
Genus: Asellia
 Trident leaf-nosed bat, Asellia tridens LC
Genus: Hipposideros
 Fulvus roundleaf bat, Hipposideros fulvus LC

Order: Erinaceomorpha (hedgehogs and gymnures)

The order Erinaceomorpha contains a single family, Erinaceidae, which comprise the hedgehogs and gymnures. The hedgehogs are easily recognised by their spines while gymnures look more like large rats.

Family: Erinaceidae (hedgehogs)
Subfamily: Erinaceinae
Genus: Hemiechinus
 Long-eared hedgehog, H. auritus 
Genus: Paraechinus
 Brandt's hedgehog, P. hypomelas

Order: Lagomorpha (lagomorphs)

The lagomorphs comprise two families, Leporidae (hares and rabbits), and Ochotonidae (pikas). Though they can resemble rodents, and were classified as a superfamily in that order until the early 20th century, they have since been considered a separate order. They differ from rodents in a number of physical characteristics, such as having four incisors in the upper jaw rather than two.

Family: Leporidae (rabbits, hares)
Genus: Lepus
Cape hare, L. capensis 
Desert hare, L. tibetanus 
Tolai hare, L. tolai 
Family: Ochotonidae (pikas)
Genus: Ochotona
 Large-eared pika, O. macrotis 
 Afghan pika, O. rufescens 
 Turkestan red pika, O. rutila

Order: Primates

The order Primates contains humans and their closest relatives: lemurs, lorisoids, monkeys, and apes.
Family: Cercopithecidae (Old World monkeys)
Genus: Macaca
 Rhesus macaque, M. mulatta 

Family: Hominidae (hominids)
Genus: Homo
 Human, H. sapiens

Order: Rodentia (rodents)

Rodents make up the largest order of mammals, with over 40 percent of mammalian species. They have two incisors in the upper and lower jaw which grow continually and must be kept short by gnawing. Most rodents are small though the capybara can weigh up to 45 kg (100 lb).

Suborder: Sciurognathi
Family: Sciuridae (squirrels)
Subfamily: Sciurinae
Tribe: Pteromyini
Genus: Hylopetes
 Afghan flying squirrel, H. baberi 
Genus: Petaurista
 Red giant flying squirrel, P. petaurista 
Subfamily: Callosciurinae
Genus: Funambulus
 Northern palm squirrel, Funambulus pennantii 
Subfamily: Xerinae
Tribe: Xerini
Genus: Spermophilopsis
 Long-clawed ground squirrel, Spermophilopsis leptodactylus 
Tribe: Marmotini
Genus: Marmota
 Long-tailed marmot, Marmota caudata 
Genus: Spermophilus
 Yellow ground squirrel, Spermophilus fulvus 
Family: Gliridae (dormice)
Subfamily: Leithiinae
Genus: Dryomys
 Forest dormouse, Dryomys nitedula 
Family: Dipodidae (jerboas)
Subfamily: Allactaginae
Genus: Allactaga
 Small five-toed jerboa, Allactaga elater 
 Euphrates jerboa, Allactaga euphratica 
 Hotson's jerboa, Allactaga hotsoni 
Subfamily: Cardiocraniinae
Genus: Salpingotus
 Thomas's pygmy jerboa, Salpingotus thomasi 
Subfamily: Dipodinae
Genus: Jaculus
 Blanford's jerboa, Jaculus blanfordi 
Family: Calomyscidae
Genus: Calomyscus
 Baluchi mouse-like hamster, Calomyscus baluchi 
 Afghan mouse-like hamster, Calomyscus mystax 
Family: Cricetidae
Subfamily: Cricetinae
Genus: Cricetulus
 Grey dwarf hamster, Cricetulus migratorius 
Subfamily: Arvicolinae
Genus: Alticola
 Silver mountain vole, Alticola argentatus 
Genus: Blanfordimys
 Afghan vole, Blanfordimys afghanus 
 Bucharian vole, Blanfordimys bucharicus 
Genus: Ellobius
 Southern mole vole, Ellobius fuscocapillus 
Genus: Microtus
 Juniper vole, Microtus juldaschi 
 Tien Shan vole, Microtus kirgisorum 
 Transcaspian vole, Microtus transcaspicus 
Family: Muridae (mice, rats, voles, gerbils, hamsters, etc.)
Subfamily: Gerbillinae
Genus: Gerbillus
 Swarthy gerbil, Gerbillus aquilus 
 Balochistan gerbil, Gerbillus nanus 
Genus: Meriones
 Sundevall's jird, Meriones crassus 
 Libyan jird, Meriones libycus 
 Mid-day jird, Meriones meridianus 
 Persian jird, Meriones persicus 
 Zarudny's jird, Meriones zarudnyi 
Genus: Rhombomys
 Great gerbil, Rhombomys opimus 
Genus: Tatera
 Indian gerbil, Tatera indica 
Subfamily: Murinae
Genus: Apodemus
 Ward's field mouse, Apodemus wardi 
Genus: Millardia
 Sand-colored soft-furred rat, Millardia gleadowi 
Genus: Nesokia
 Short-tailed bandicoot rat, Nesokia indica 
Genus: Rattus
 Tanezumi rat, Rattus tanezumi 
 Turkestan rat, Rattus turkestanicus

Order: Soricomorpha (shrews, moles, and solenodons)

The "shrew-forms" are insectivorous mammals. The shrews and solenodons closely resemble mice while the moles are stout-bodied burrowers.
Family: Soricidae (shrews)
Subfamily: Crocidurinae
Genus: Crocidura
 Gmelin's white-toothed shrew, C. gmelini 
 Taiga shrew, C. pullata 
Lesser white-toothed shrew, C. suaveolens 
 Zarudny's shrew, C. zarudnyi 
Genus: Suncus
 Etruscan shrew, S. etruscus 
Asian house shrew, S. murinus 
Subfamily: Soricinae
Tribe: Soricini
Genus: Sorex
 Eurasian pygmy shrew, S. minutus

Locally extinct 
The following species are locally extinct in the country:
 Cheetah, Acinonyx jubatus
 Dhole, Cuon alpinus
 Onager, Equus hemionus
 Lion, Panthera leo
 Tiger, Panthera tigris

See also
List of chordate orders
Lists of mammals by region
Mammal classification

References

External links

 
Mammals
Afghan
 Afghan
Afghanistan